Värmland County  is a constituency of the Riksdag, currently electing 11 of its 349 members.

Results

2018

References

Riksdag constituencies
Värmland County